A rotating cone tactile device is a haptic device used at traffic light controlled pedestrian crossings in the United Kingdom. It is used as a tactile signal for blind pedestrians to indicate that it is safe to cross the road.

The idea for the devices originated at Nottingham University.

References

See also 
 Tactile paving

Blindness equipment
Assistive technology
Haptic technology